= Renaturation =

Renaturation can mean:

- Renaturation, in biochemistry, the reversal of the process of denaturation
- Ecological restoration, also sometimes called renaturization
